Albert Victor Grayland (24 March 1900 – 3 February 1963) was an English cricketer.  Grayland was a right-handed batsman who bowled right-arm fast-medium. He was born and died at Birmingham, Warwickshire.

Grayland made his first-class debut for Warwickshire against Somerset in the 1922 County Championship.  He played a single match in 1923 against Worcestershire and a single match in 1924 against Somerset, before making a fourth and final first-class appearance against Surrey in 1930.  In his four first-class matches, Grayland scored a total of 15 runs at an average of 3.00, with a high score of 6.  With the ball, he took 2 wickets at a  bowling average of 102.00, with best figures of 1/23.

References

External links
Albert Grayland at ESPNcricinfo

1900 births
1963 deaths
Cricketers from Birmingham, West Midlands
English cricketers
Warwickshire cricketers
English cricketers of 1919 to 1945